Bukit Ho Swee (河水山) is a Singaporean Chinese language TV series aired in 2002 on Channel 8. With the "kampungs" of Bukit Ho Swee, a prominent Chinese estate notorious for its cramped squatters and gangsters at that time, as a backdrop, the series is set during the 1950s prior to the infamous fire of 1961.

Synopsis
The story revolves around the tenants who live in Bukit Ho Swee. The tenants engage in petty squabbles with one another frequently and it is only during times of difficulties that some of them realise the strong bonds that have been forged along the way as well as the importance of harmonious living.

Cast
Florence Tan as Liao Meiying
Allan Wu as Lin Zaifa
Qi Yuwu as Cai Yongsong
Priscelia Chan as Su Yanfen
Vivian Lai as Wang Qing
Xiang Yun as Liao Meijiao
Chen Tianwen as Feng Sidong
Yang Libing as Xiuzhen jie (Feng Sidong's wife)
Liang Weidong as Zhou laoshi
Carole Lin as Zhou Taitai (Zhou laoshi's wife)
Henry Thia as A Zhu
Pei Xiaoling as A Zhu sao (A Zhu's wife)
Brandon Wong as A Can
Yan Bingliang as He Biao
Ye Shipin as Lei Ming
Andi Lim as Saka
Liang Tian
Zhu Xiufeng

References

External links
Theme Song on YouTube
Bukit Ho Swee (English) on Mediacorp website
Bukit Ho Swee (Chinese) on Mediacorp website

Singapore Chinese dramas
2002 Singaporean television series debuts
Channel 8 (Singapore) original programming